StalkHer is a 2015 Australian romantic comedy thriller film directed by John Jarratt and Kaarin Fairfax – both also star in the film.

Plot synopsis

John Jarratt stars as Jack, who is pushed past the brink of his stalking obsession over Emily (Kaarin Fairfax) when he breaks into her house to take what he wants by force. However, his plans backfire when he wakes up to find himself tied to a chair in her kitchen. For a full night, Jack and Emily engage in a twisted and thrilling courtship of the sexes that leads one to wonder which one of them will survive the night. At the end of the movie, Jack finally gets the upper hand on Emily and strangles her to death.

Cast
 John Jarratt as Jack
 Kaarin Fairfax as Emily
 Alan Finney as Mr. Schiller
 Robert Coleby as Dr. Jacob Weeks
 Charlie Jarratt as Alex

Reception
On Rotten Tomatoes the film has an approval rating of 33% based on reviews from 6 critics.

Jim Schembri of 3AW gave a positive review, writing "Veteran John Jarratt co-directed this with Kaarin Fairfax, and while they let fly at each other with copious energy, their verbal conflagration could have benefitted from fewer swear words, more jokes and a tighter running time." Erin Free of film magazine Filmink called the film "a nifty little black comedy bubbling and bristling with surprises and invention."

John Noonan, also from Filmink, gave a negative review, writing "Whilst it doesn't stick its landing when the credits roll, Wolf Creek fans are perhaps going to get a kick out of seeing Jarratt failing to get the upper hand for a change." Luke Buckmaster of Guardian called it "a marathon of smut, with nothing remotely funny or thrilling about it."

Soundtrack 

StalkHer (Original Soundtrack) by various artists was issued on 31 July 2015 via Remote Control Records. The title track was recorded by Maddy and Memphis Kelly (Kaarin's daughters) and released as the soundtrack's second single.

References

External links
 StalkHer at Internet Movie Database

Australian romantic comedy films
2015 films
2015 romantic comedy films
Films set in Queensland
Films shot in Queensland
2010s English-language films
2010s Australian films